Narcis Lucian Mohora (born 6 May 1971) is a Romanian former footballer who played as a defender. After he ended his playing career he worked as an assistant coach.

Honours
Jiul Craiova
Divizia C: 1990–91

References

1971 births
Living people
Romanian footballers
Association football defenders
Liga I players
Liga II players
Liga III players
FC U Craiova 1948 players
FC Dinamo București players
FC Rapid București players
FCV Farul Constanța players
FC Drobeta-Turnu Severin players
CSM Jiul Petroșani players
Romanian expatriate footballers
Expatriate footballers in Germany
Romanian expatriate sportspeople in Germany
Sportspeople from Galați